Dorsum is a genus of moths of the family Erebidae erected by Michael Fibiger in 2011.

Species
Dorsum brunescens Fibiger, 2011
Dorsum kwaii Fibiger, 2011
Dorsum teraii Fibiger, 2011
Dorsum bengali Fibiger, 2011
Dorsum atlas Fibiger, 2011

References

Micronoctuini
Noctuoidea genera